Brett Clarke (born 27 October 1972) is an Australian Olympic table tennis player from Melbourne. He won the silver medal at the 2002 Manchester Commonwealth Games in the Mixed Doubles event.

He was appointed as head coach of the Australian men's table tennis team in 2017.

References

1972 births
Living people
Olympic table tennis players of Australia
Table tennis players at the 2000 Summer Olympics
Table tennis players at the 2002 Commonwealth Games
Commonwealth Games medallists in table tennis
Commonwealth Games silver medallists for Australia
Australian male table tennis players
20th-century Australian people
21st-century Australian people
Medallists at the 2002 Commonwealth Games